Lindahl is a Swedish surname which may refer to

People
Anna Lindahl  (1904–1952), Swedish film actress
Axel Lindahl  (1841–1906), Swedish photographer 
Axel Lindahl (athlete) (born 1995), Swedish footballer
Axel Lindahl (footballer) (1841–1906), Swedish photographer
Bruce Lindahl (1919–2014), American politician
Cathrine Lindahl (born 1970), Swedish curler
Erik Lindahl (1891–1960), Swedish economist
Fredrik Lindahl (born 1983), Swedish handball player
Fredrik Lindahl (politician) (born 1987), Swedish politician
Hans Lindahl (born 1954), Swedish comic book artist
Hedvig Lindahl (born 1983), Swedish football (soccer) goalkeeper
John Lindahl (born 1996), American singer & songwriter
Josua Lindahl (1844–1914), Swedish scientist
Karl Lindahl (1890–1960), Swedish gymnast who competed in the 1920 Summer Olympics
Karl Lindahl (architect) (1874–1930), Finnish architect of Swedish origin
Lisa Lindahl (born 1948), American inventor
Marita Lindahl (1938–2017), Finnish model and 1957 Miss World beauty pageant winner
Margaretha Lindahl (born 1974), Swedish curler, world champion and Olympic medalist
Nick Lindahl (born 1988), Australian tennis player
Peter Lindahl  (1712–1792), Swedish stage actor and theatre director 
Tomas Lindahl (born 1938), Swedish scientist and winner of the Nobel Prize and the Royal Medal

Other
Lindahl equilibrium, Taxation principal named after Erik Lindahl

Swedish-language surnames
Norwegian-language surnames